Who Knows Where the Time Goes? is a retrospective compilation of the work of English folk rock singer Sandy Denny issued in 1985. It is a four LP boxed set released on the Island Records label in the UK and Germany and on Hannibal/Carthage Records in the US, later reissued as a three CD set. It includes released and previously unreleased recordings from 1967 to 1977, live performances, outtakes and demos from Denny's solo career, and with Fairport Convention, Fotheringay and Strawbs.

The set included a twenty-page booklet featuring many photographs of Denny, her family, and friends, as well as lyrics of most of the songs, and instrumental credits.

Reception
AllMusic praised the album, describing it as "[a] magnificently produced ... complete portrait of Sandy Denny", Denny herself as "the haunting singer, the melodic, mournful songwriter", and summed up the collection as "[t]he album makes the case for Denny as a major folk artist."

Rolling Stone'''s David Fricke described the set as "worthy of her largely unrecognized talent.. (and) has captured her finest hours for all time"

Track listing
All songs are credited to Sandy Denny except where noted.

Side one
 "The Lady" – 5:08 – recorded live in London(during what would end up being Sandy's last concert), 1977
 "Listen, Listen" – 3:57 – from Sandy "Next Time Around" – 4:23 – from The North Star Grassman and the Ravens "Farewell, Farewell" (Richard Thompson) – 2:38 – from Liege and Lief (Fairport Convention) 
 "The Music Weaver" - 3:04 - demo recorded 1972
 "Tomorrow is a Long Time" (Bob Dylan) – 3:56 – from SandySide two
 "The Quiet Joys of Brotherhood" (words: Richard Fariña) – 5:58 – unreleased track by Fairport Convention
 "The Pond and the Stream" – 3:16 – from Fotheringay "One Way Donkey Ride" – 3:34 – from Rendezvous "Take Away the Load (Sandy's Song)" – 1:36 – demo recorded 1976
 "One More Chance" – 7:52 – from Rising for the Moon (Fairport Convention)

Side three
 "Bruton Town" – 4:47 – BBC recording 1972
 "Blackwaterside" – 4:15 – from The North Star Grassman and the Ravens "Tam Lin" – 7:10 – from Liege and Lief (Fairport Convention) 
 "The Banks of the Nile" –  8:06 – from FotheringaySide four
 "Sail Away to the Sea" (Dave Cousins) – 3:25 – from All Our Own Work (Sandy and The Strawbs)
 "You Never Wanted Me" (Jackson C. Frank) – 3:08 – BBC recording 1968 (Fairport Convention)
 "Sweet Rosemary" –  2:40 – demo recorded 1972
 "Now And Then" - 3:45 - demo recorded 1968
 "Autopsy" – 4:19 – from Unhalfbricking (Fairport Convention)
 "It'll Take a Long Time" – 5:14 – from SandySide five
 "Two Weeks Last Summer" (Dave Cousins) – 3:50 – unreleased track by Fotheringay
 "Late November" –  4:31 – from the Island sampler El Pea (Fotheringay)
 "Gypsy Davey" (Traditional) – 3:53 – unreleased track by Fotheringay, 1970
 "Winter Winds" –  2:10 – from Fotheringay "Nothing More" –  4:56 – recorded live in Rotterdam, 1970 (Fotheringay)
 "Memphis, Tennessee" (Chuck Berry) – 4:00 – recorded live in Rotterdam, 1970 (Fotheringay)

Side six
 "Walking the Floor Over You" – 4:17 – unreleased track 1971/73
 "When Will I Be Loved?" (Don and Phil Everly) – 3:10 – from The Bunch (duet w/ Linda Thompson)
 "Whispering Grass" (Doris Fisher and Fred Fisher) – 3:56 – from Like an Old Fashioned Waltz "Friends" - 3:31 - from Like an Old Fashioned Waltz "Solo" – 5:01 – recorded live in Los Angeles, 1974 (Fairport Convention)
 "After Halloween" – 2:57 – unreleased track, 1972

Side seven
 "For Shame of Doing Wrong" (Richard Thompson) – 3:42 – from Rendezvous "Stranger to Himself" – 2:50 – from Rising for the Moon (Fairport Convention)
 "I'm a Dreamer" – 4:43 – from Rendezvous "John the Gun" – 5:11 – from Fairport Live Convention (A Moveable Feast)
 "Knockin' on Heaven's Door" (Bob Dylan) – 4:30 – recorded live in Los Angeles, 1974 (Fairport Convention)

Side eight
 "By the Time it Gets Dark" – 3:20 – demo recorded 1974
 "What is True?" – 3:44 – demo recorded 1973
 "The Sea" – 5:25 – from Fotheringay
 "Full Moon" – 4:30 – unreleased track, 1976
 "Who Knows Where the Time Goes?" – 6:37 – recorded live Los Angeles, 1974 (Fairport Convention)

CD release
The tracks on the 1991 CD release were in the same order as on the original vinyl discs:
Disc one : Sides one & two and tracks one and two of Side three,
Disc two : tracks three and four of Side three, Sides four and five, and track one of Side six
Disc three : the rest

4CDs release
Disc one : Same as CD release
Disc two : Same as CD release
Disc three : Same as CD release
Disc four
 
 "It'll Take A Long Time" - 05:43 – live 1 February 1974 at Los Angeles (Fairport Convention)
 "John The Gun" - 05:39 – live 1 February 1974 at Los Angeles (Fairport Convention)
 "She Moves Through The Fair (Trad. / Words by Padraic Colum)" - 03:27 – live 1 February 1974 at Los Angeles (Fairport Convention)
 "Autopsy" - 04:25 – demo recorded 30 December 1968
 "Take Me Away" - 03:57 – home demo recorded 1977
 "One Way Donkey Ride" - 04:11 – home demo recorded 1977
 "Still Waters Run Deep" - 03:57 – home demo recorded 1977
 "By The Time It Gets Dark" - 03:30 – alternate demo recorded 1977
 "By The Time It Gets Dark" - 03:38 – run through recorded 1977
 "By The Time It Gets Dark" - 04:06 – alternate take recorded 1977
 "All Our Days" - 03:37 – home demo recorded 1977
 "Full Moon" - 04:28  – home demo recorded 1977
 "Losing Game  (James Carr & Denny Weaver)" - 03:14 – alternate take recorded 4 April and 18 June 1977 (duet /w Jess Roden)
 "Silver Threads And Golden Needles (Dick Reynolds & Jack Rhodes)" - 04:29 – unreleased take by Fotheringay
 "Moments (Bryn Haworth)" - 03:43 – the last recording of Sandy Denny recorded 20 May 1977
 "No More Sad Refrains" - 03:05 – home demo recorded 1977

Issue history
1985: (UK) 4 LPs - Island SDSP 100
1986: (US) 4 LPs - Hannibal 100/CD - Hannibal HAN5301
1991: LP/CD - Hannibal 5301
1991: CS - Hannibal HNBC-5301
2009: 4CDs – Universal Japan UICY94090

References

Most information taken from the original booklet
[ Allmusic]
Sandy Denny: Who Knows Where the Time Goes?

Who Knows Where the Time Goes
Albums produced by Joe Boyd
Who Knows Where the Time Goes
Who Knows Where the Time Goes